The , also known as the , is stationed in the Japan Ground Self-Defense Force (JGSDF) Camp Narashino in Funabashi, Chiba Prefecture.

The Brigade serves as Japan's elite paratrooper unit meant to counter against either guerrilla warfare or commando and special forces units enemy. Currently, they are attached to current homeland defense and international combat operations under the JGSDF's Ground Component Command (formerly under the Central Readiness Force).

History

In 1958, the Airborne Brigade's first platoon was formed after Hayao Kinugasa was made the first commander of the unit. It continued to increase in numbers as ranger and free-fall training were added in 1962 and 1969. An additional armed transport unit was established in 1973.

In 1985, the 1st Airborne Brigade was involved in rescue operations of the downed Japan Airlines Flight 123 in the ridges of Mount Takamagahara in Gunma Prefecture after the local volunteer fire corps found some survivors, marking the first time that the Brigade was seen in the public eye. Later on, they were also deployed in Yamanashi Prefecture for civil operations and after the Great Hanshin-Awaji earthquake in 1995.

A Guide Unit was established on October 20, 1999, and based at Funabashi, Chiba. Preparations to create a new special forces unit went underway in the Brigade in 2000.  In 2003, the framework of the Special Operations Group was established as an anti-guerrilla/terrorist unit embedded in the Brigade, but was established and separated from the Brigade in 2004 and placed under the control of the Defense Agency via the JGSDF like most of the JSDF's special forces units.

Brigade paratroopers were involved in Iraq as the Brigade rotated ground personnel as part of the Japanese government's commitment to Iraq. They were withdrawn alongside the bulk of the Japanese Iraqi Reconstruction Support Group in the middle of 2006. The brigade was added to the Central Readiness Force on March 28, 2007.

On October 9, 2006, members of the Oregon National Guard had a hand in assisting soldiers of the 1st Airborne Brigade in establishing a sniper school to train the unit's first generation of highly skilled snipers during Orient Shield '07.

In March 2018, the brigade was integrated into the Ground Component Command after the Central Readiness Force was disbanded.

On March 4, 2020, the brigade recruited Sergeant Reina Hashiba, the first female paratrooper who passed selection process.

Due to ongoing COVID-19 outbreak in Japan, the brigade has conducted protective measures by letting its paratroopers wear facemasks and limiting the presence of spectators with its first exercise on January 13, 2021.

Scandals

Firearms handling
In 1994, Colonel Yasunobu Hideshima was arrested by JGSDF military police officers for violating both the Self-Defense Forces Law and the Firearm and Sword Control Law when he allowed three of his friends to use JGSDF firearms without prior authorization. Lieutenant Colonels Yoshiharu Amano and Michihiko Suzuki were suspended for 20 days for neglect of duty.

Iraq War
Another scandal emerged from within the unit when a 38-year-old 1st Airborne Brigade paratrooper was arrested in Inzai, Chiba Prefecture for shoplifting. He admitted to officers that he did it to demonstrate that he was serious in his effort to avoid deployment to Iraq. When JGSDF officials heard about this, they told press officials that they require the consent of the troopers and their relatives. Otherwise, they would not be deployed. The Iraq deployment had caused a national debate in Japan, and a new public consensus was necessary for the military to develop a modern role and structure.

Assault
A brigade paratrooper was disciplined for bringing a lighter to the dorms at Camp Narashino when it was used to burn the feet of his two juniors.

Requirements

Before joining the 1st Airborne Brigade, all potential candidates must be able to pass the following requirements:
 Join the Brigade on or under 28 if a private; otherwise NCOs (usually Sergeants) must join on or under 36 years of age.
 Have the standard weight and height of 49 kg and 161 cm with chest measurements at 78.5 cm
 Lung capacity of at least 3,200 cm3 or more
 Have no criminal record
 Have the following points from his time in the JGSDF:
 5 classes or more, 1st method above various eye minimum of 45 points
 Airborne system has been above each minimum of 60 points of 5 items such as suspension stopping jump from aircraft.
 Must be able to lift objects at 30 kg, under, and above for 50 s
 Blood pressure must be at 140mmHg~100mmHg and 90mmHg to candidates who are 34 years old or less.

Ranger qualification
1AB paratroopers receive ranger qualification at part of their training. The Ranger badge is highly sought by active duty SDF personnel.

Structure 

The brigade's structure is as follows:
 Brigade Headquarters, in Funabashi
 Headquarters Company
 Signal Company
 1st Airborne Infantry Battalion
 2nd Airborne Infantry Battalion
 3rd Airborne Infantry Battalion
 Airborne Artillery Battalion (3 x batteries with F1 120mm mortars)
 Airborne Logistic Support Battalion
 Engineer Company
 Airborne School

Weapons
Standard weapons are from the JGSDF, including:
 Howa Type 89-F (Para) rifle
 SIG Sauer P220 pistol
 Minebea PM-9 submachine gun
 Remington M24 sniper rifle
 Sumitomo Heavy Industries M249 LMG
 Toshiba Type 91 Mobile SAM launcher
 Kawasaki Type 01 LMAT, a man-portable fire-and-forget anti-tank missile

Deployment

Local

 1st Airborne Brigade paratroopers have only been seen in action through annual new year JSDF exhibition shows in Narashino.

Overseas
 170 paratroopers were sent to Samawah, Iraq as part of the JGSDF's commitment to the international effort. Training was conducted for a short time in a joint exercise with American soldiers of the Oregon Army National Guard's 2nd Battalion, 162nd Infantry Regiment. All of them were withdrawn following the end of the Japanese commitment in Iraq.

Notable personnel
 Akihiko Saito
 Keisuke Itagaki
 Yasunobu Hideshima
 Nakamura Morioka

Notes

External links
 1st Airborne Brigade Official Webpage 
 1st Airborne Brigade Exhibition Page
 1st Airborne Brigade Unofficial Information page from its training research group

Airborne infantry brigades
Japan Ground Self-Defense Force Brigade
Military units and formations established in 1958
1958 establishments in Japan